George Nicolaas 'Nico' Wegner (born 3 December 1968) is a former South African rugby union player.

Playing career
Wegner represented the Lowveld Schools team at the annual Craven Week in 1986 held in Graaff-Reinet. After school he did his national service and then enrolled at Stellenbosch University. He made his debut for the Western Province senior side in 1992. Wegner moved to the Sharks in 1997 and joined the Falcons in 2000.

Wegner made his test debut for South Africa during the 1993 French tour of South Africa, in second test on 3 July 1993 at Ellis Park in Johannesburg. In 1993 Wegner toured with the Springboks to Australia, where he played in all three tests and to Argentina. He also toured as a replacement to New Zealand in 1994. Wegner played in four tests matches and eight tour matches for the Springboks.

Test history

See also
List of South Africa national rugby union players – Springbok no. 587

References

1968 births
Living people
South African rugby union players
South Africa international rugby union players
Western Province (rugby union) players
Sharks (Currie Cup) players
People from Mbombela
Rugby union players from Mpumalanga
Rugby union locks